This is a list of the Australian moth species of the family Incurvariidae. It also acts as an index to the species articles and forms part of the full List of moths of Australia.

Perthida glyphopa Common, 1969
Perthida pentaspila (Meyrick, 1916)
Perthida phoenicopa (Meyrick, 1893)
Perthida tetraspila (Lower, 1905)

The following species belong to the family Incurvariidae, but have not been assigned to a genus yet. Given here is the original name given to the species when it was first described:
Tinea aelurodes Meyrick, 1893
Tinea epimochla Meyrick, 1893
Tinea incredibilis Meyrick, 1920
Tinea microspora Meyrick, 1893
Tinea monopthalma Meyrick, 1893
Tinea nectarea Meyrick, 1893
Tinea phauloptera Meyrick, 1893
Tinea spodina Meyrick, 1893
Tinea vetula Meyrick, 1893

External links 
Incurvariidae at Australian Faunal Directory

Australia